Parhuz may refer to:
 Parhuz-e Talkhab Shirin